The Nardi Group, founded by Francesco Nardi in 1895, is one of the leading Italian manufacturers of agricultural machinery distributing today in 85 countries around the world.

It is based in Selci Lama in the Province of Perugia and is specialized in the production of ploughs which can boast of having built the 'largest specimen'.

The Nardi Group is also the owner of the trademarks MARZIA and SOGEMA, which were family holding companies folded into the main company in the early 2000s.

In December 2017, the Nardi group was sold to Xete Investments, and English company for restructuring.

See also

 List of Italian companies

Notes

Manufacturing companies established in 1895
Italian companies established in 1895
Italian brands